Edinburgh Waverley railway station (also known simply as Waverley) is the principal railway station serving Edinburgh, Scotland. It is the second busiest station in Scotland, after Glasgow Central.

Location 

Waverley station is situated in a steep, narrow valley between the medieval Old Town and the 18th century New Town. Princes Street, the premier shopping street, runs close to its north side. The valley is bridged by the North Bridge, rebuilt in 1897 as a three-span iron and steel bridge, on huge sandstone piers. This passes high above the station's central section, with the greater half of the station being west of North Bridge.  

The central booking hall is just west of the northern massive stone pier of the bridge and cleverly hides it within its bulk. Waverley Bridge lies at the western end of the station (though platforms extend below it) and it is this road which, by means of ramps, formerly afforded vehicular access to the station and still provides two of the six pedestrian entrances to the station. 

The valley to the west of the station, formerly the site of the Nor Loch, is the public parkland of Princes Street Gardens. Directly east of the station are St Andrew's House, which accommodates part of the Scottish Government and Governor's House.

Previous stations 

Edinburgh's Old Town, perched on a steep-sided sloping ridge, was bounded on the north by a valley in which the Nor Loch had been formed. In the 1750s overcrowding led to proposals to link across this valley to allow development to the north. The "noxious lake" was to be narrowed into "a canal of running water", with a bridge formed across the east end of the loch adjacent to the physic garden. This link was built from 1766 as the North Bridge and at the same time plans for the New Town began development to the north, with Princes Street to get unobstructed views south over sloping gardens and the proposed canal. The loch was drained as work on the bridge proceeded. In 1770 a coachbuilder began work on properties feued at the corner between the bridge and Princes Street, and feuers on the other side of the street strongly objected to this construction blocking their views to the south. A series of court cases ended with the decision that the buildings nearing completion could stay, immediately to the west of that some workshops would be allowed below the level of Princes Street, and further west a park would be "kept and preserved in perpetuity as pleasure ground" in what became Princes Street Gardens.

In the mid 1830s proposals for a railway from Glasgow running along the gardens to a station at the North Bridge were set out in a prospectus with assurances that the trains would be concealed from view, and smoke from them "would scarcely be seen". An association of "Princes Street Proprietors" who had feued houses in the street, and had spent large sums turning the "filthy and offensive bog" of the Nor Loch into quiet gardens, strongly opposed the railway and in late 1836 put forward their case against the Act of Parliament for the railway. The Edinburgh and Glasgow Railway opened in 1842 with its terminus at Haymarket railway station, stopping short of Princes Street. In the Railway Mania of the 1840s, the railway sought another Act of Parliament allowing access along the gardens, and at the same time two other railways proposed terminus stations at the North Bridge site. By then several of the Princes Street properties were shops or hotels with an interest in development, and agreement was reached in 1844 on walls and embankments to conceal the Edinburgh and Glasgow railway line in a cutting, with compensation of almost £2,000 for the proprietors.

The North Bridge station was opened on 22 June 1846 by the North British Railway as the terminus for its line from Berwick-upon-Tweed. The Edinburgh and Glasgow Railway's General station opened on 17 May 1847, on the same day as the Canal Street station of the Edinburgh, Leith and Newhaven Railway, serving Leith and Granton via a long rope-hauled tunnel under the New Town. The collective name "Waverley", after the Waverley Novels by Sir Walter Scott, was used for the three from around 1854 when the through "Waverley" route to Carlisle opened. Canal Street station was also known as Edinburgh Princes Street, not to be confused with the Caledonian Railway railway station later built at the West End which was named Princes Street station from 1870.

The present Waverley station 

From 1866-1868, the North British Railway acquired the stations of its rivals, demolished all three and closed the Scotland Street tunnel to Canal Street. The present Victorian station was built on the site. Along the tracks of this first station, Hanna, Donald & Wilson built some very impressive roofs. The station was extended in the late 19th century. In 1897, the impressive glass dome was added. Waverley has been in continual use since, under the auspices of the North British, the LNER, British Railways (rebranded as British Rail after 1965), Railtrack and latterly Network Rail. From its opening in its current form by the eastward tunnelled extension from Haymarket, Waverley has been the principal railway station in Edinburgh. From 1870 to 1965, the city had a second major station, Princes Street, operated by the rival Caledonian Railway, but this was never as important as Waverley.

British Rail brought railway electrification in 1991 with electric trains on the East Coast Main Line to Glasgow Central and via York to London King's Cross.

The station's large size and the unusual topography of its surroundings mean that it contains a large amount of valuable, centrally located land. The station's successive owners, British Rail, Railtrack and its current owner Network Rail have been criticised for underusing the valuable city-centre spaces available within, there being a legal covenant preventing any upwards extension, which would obstruct the view of Arthur's Seat from Princes Street. The elevated walkway linking the Waverley Steps (from Princes Street to Market Street) has been upgraded with the recommissioning of the suburban platforms (at the south) and provision of additional through platforms to the north to serve the increased proportion of through rail traffic.

During 2006 and 2007, parts of Waverley were extensively refurbished, including two new through platforms and the electrification of platforms 12 to 18 in preparation for electric trains from the Airdrie-Bathgate Rail Link and future lines in Scotland to be electrified by the EGIP (Edinburgh/Glasgow Improvement Project).

From 2010 to 2012, the glazing of the roof of Waverley station was entirely replaced with new strengthened clear glass panels, replacing the old  of mixed surfaces including felt, cloudy wired glass and plastic sheet. Part of a £130 million upgrade, this has greatly increased the amount of natural light in the station.

Recent developments 
From 2012 to 2014, improvements included: a new set of covered escalators at Waverley Steps leading to Princes Street (narrowing the huge set of previously open-air steps); a rebuilt and widened entrance from Market Street; a rebuilding of the canopies on the southern suburban line; a restoration of the central space in the ticket hall; and major improvements to the Calton Road access. Internally, several new lifts and escalators have greatly aided circulation.

A new drop-off point and disabled parking/access was added on the Calton Road access in 2014.

In mid-2017, as part of the Edinburgh to Glasgow Improvement Programme, platform 12 was extended. At the same time the former Motorail bay platforms were extended into a former car park area and taxi rank to allow platforms 5 and 6 to be extended to accommodate additional London North Eastern Railway services. Platforms 5 and 6 were brought into use on 28 February 2019.

Work began in 2020 to reopen a corridor from the ticket office to the eastern concourse; this will also see the toilets replaced and a Changing Places facility installed.

Adjacent buildings 

As at other large railway stations of the Victorian and Edwardian eras, the railway company constructed a grand station hotel beside their station. The North British Hotel, adjacent to the station at the corner between Princes Street and North Bridge (on the site of the coachworks), opened in 1902. In 1983, British Rail sold it to the Forte hotel group. In 1988, Forte closed the hotel for a year to extensively remodel and update what had become something of a faded jewel. When it reopened, it was rechristened The New Balmoral Hotel, maintaining the NB initials in what has proved to be an astute marketing move, despite the hotel being  from Balmoral Castle; subsequently, New was dropped from the name. The hotel enjoys commanding views over central Edinburgh and is one of the most luxurious and expensive hotels in the UK. There is no longer a direct entrance from the station.

Waverley Market is a shopping centre which occupies the space between Waverley Station, Waverley Bridge, Princes Street and the Balmoral hotel. It was formerly known as Waverley Market, Waverley Shopping Centre and Princes Mall; it opened in 1985. The mall has benefited from the installation of escalators on the Waverley Steps to Princes Street in 2011. From 1844 to 1938, the site was home to a fruit and vegetable market which gained an iron roof in the 1870s.

Services 

Several train operating companies serve the station. The typical off-peak service in trains per hour (tph) and trains per day (tpd) as of the December 2022 timetable change is as follows.

London North Eastern Railway
 2 tph to : 
 4 tpd to 
 1 tpd to 
 1 tpd to  via 

CrossCountry
 2 tpd to  via 

Avanti West Coast

TransPennine Express

Lumo

Caledonian Sleeper

ScotRail
 2 tph to 
 1 tph to 
 1 train every 2 hours to 
 8 tpd to  via 
 1 tph to  via 
 2 tph to  via  and  low level
 2 tph to  via  (express service)
 1 tph to  via  (stopping)
 5 tpd to  via  (intercity service)

London North Eastern Railway also operate their Flying Scotsman service once per day to London, southbound only, departing at 0540, calling at Newcastle only, and arriving at London King's Cross exactly four hours later at 0940.

Lumo started operating services from London King's Cross to Edinburgh Waverley via Stevenage, Newcastle and Morpeth in October 2021.

Routes – present and past

Layout

The main station facilities are located in the middle of what is essentially a large island platform which is surrounded by platforms on all four sides. There are 20 numbered platforms. There are three pairs of platforms which share the same tracks.
There are two tracks on the north side. The northernmost track is split between Platform 20 (west) and Platform 1 (east) and the other is split between Platform 19 (west) and Platform 2 (east).
There are four east-facing bay platforms, Platforms 3–6.
There are four tracks on the south side. From north to south, these are:
A track which is split between Platform 11 (west) and Platform 7 (east).
Platform 10.
Platform 9, which is subdivided into "9w" (west) and "9e" (east) sections.
Platform 8, which is subdivided likewise.
There are seven west-facing bay platforms, Platforms 12–18.

Past layout

A total of 24 platforms have existed at Waverley, but not more than 21 at any one time. Prior to incremental rationalisation of the east end in the 1960s–80s there were 21 platforms.

The east end terminating platforms have undergone significant rationalisation. From north to south these comprised:
 former Platforms 2 and 3, which were latterly used for parcels/mail traffic only and were removed in the 1980s when a new Royal Mail facility was built on their site;
 former Platforms 4 and 5 were also retained for parcels/mail traffic until this ceased; Platform 5 was reopened to passengers in 2006 as the new Platform 3;
 former platforms 6 and 7, of which only the latter survives, now numbered 4; and
 former Platforms 8 and 9, which were substantially shortened for use as a Motorail terminus, the infilled area becoming a car park; since the demise of Motorail services these platforms were used only for locomotive stabling, although the numbers 5/6 were reserved for them in the 2006 renumbering. These were extended as full length platforms to accommodate terminating CrossCountry and London North Eastern Railway services with the taxi rank closed in June 2014 to make way for these works which were completed in early 2019.

The former Down Main through Platforms 7 (east end) and 8 (west end) are at the south side of the main station, and comprise a single very long platform with a crossover in the centre. They are numbered 7 (formerly 10, east end) and 11 (west end).

At the west end there has been little change to the terminating platforms, apart from widening them by removing disused centre-road tracks. The platforms comprise (south-north) numbers 12/13, 14/15, 16/17 and bay Platform 18. These were not affected by the 2006 platform renumbering scheme.

The only platforms outwith Waverley's overall roof are the former 'Suburban' Platforms 8 and 9 (formerly 21 and 20), a lengthy island platform. These are on the southern edge of the station, adjacent to the east to the former freight depot (now a car park and offices) and with direct access to Market Street, which runs parallel to the railway to the immediate south.

A need to increase capacity for through and west-end traffic led to three new platforms being built in 2006, on land formerly occupied by disused sidings and bypass lines within the main part of the station. Platform 10 is a through platform at the west end, facing Platform 11. Platforms 1 and 20 are a single long through platform facing Platforms 2 and 19.  All are linked by the upgraded north–south overhead walkway linking the Waverley Steps (escalators) to Market Street.

In December 2006, a partial renumbering of platforms took place to reflect the construction of the new platforms.

Future developments
In March 2019, Network Rail announced proposals to redevelop Waverley station in order to meet an anticipated increase in passenger demand by 2048. The Waverley Masterplan drawn up by engineering firm Arup Group envisages the creation of a new mezzanine level concourse above the main platforms to facilitate passenger circulation within the station, with a link through to the neighbouring Waverley Mall shopping centre. As part of the redevelopment, the entrance ramps from Waverley Bridge into the station would be removed and the new concourse would be enclosed in plate glass to provide panoramic views over the Old Town. The plans also make reference to a "transport hub", although an interchange with Edinburgh Trams is not specified.

See also

Railtrack (Waverley Station) Order Confirmation Act 2000

References

Bibliography

External links 

 

Railway stations in Edinburgh
Former North British Railway stations
Railway stations in Great Britain opened in 1846
Network Rail managed stations
Railway stations served by Avanti West Coast
Railway stations served by Caledonian Sleeper
Railway stations served by CrossCountry
Railway stations served by London North Eastern Railway
Railway stations served by Lumo
Railway stations served by ScotRail
Railway stations served by TransPennine Express
Category A listed buildings in Edinburgh
Listed railway stations in Scotland
New Town, Edinburgh
1846 establishments in Scotland
Stations on the West Coast Main Line